United Nations Security Council resolution 1523, adopted unanimously on 30 January 2004, after recalling all previous resolutions on the situation in Western Sahara, particularly Resolution 1495 (2003), the Council extended the mandate of the United Nations Mission for the Referendum in Western Sahara (MINURSO) until 30 April 2004.

The decision to extend MINURSO's mandate was taken after a request by James Baker III for further discussions with Morocco concerning the Baker Plan, relating to the self-determination of the territory; the Polisario Front accepted the plan on 6 July 2003. The Secretary-General Kofi Annan was requested to report on the situation at the end of MINURSO's mandate.

See also
 Free Zone (region)
 Political status of Western Sahara
 List of United Nations Security Council Resolutions 1501 to 1600 (2003–2005)
 Sahrawi Arab Democratic Republic
 Moroccan Western Sahara Wall

References

External links
 
Text of the Resolution at undocs.org

 1523
 1523
 1523
2004 in Western Sahara
2004 in Morocco
January 2004 events